Ashley Laurence is an American actress and visual artist. She made her film debut in 1987 as the lead character, Kirsty Cotton, in Clive Barker's horror film Hellraiser (1987), a role she later reprised in Hellbound: Hellraiser II (1988), Hellraiser III: Hell on Earth (1992), and Hellraiser: Hellseeker (2002). The film franchise established her as a prominent actress in horror, and she subsequently starred in Mikey (1992) and Lurking Fear (1994).

Laurence's other notable film roles include Jenny Graves in Lightning Bug (2004) and Mrs. McCormack in Red (2008). In addition to film, Laurence has had guest appearances on several television series including Hercules: The Legendary Journeys (1996), Suddenly Susan (1997), Beverly Hills, 90210 (1999).

In addition to acting in live action film and television, Laurence made her voice acting debut as Missy Carter in the video game The Vanishing of Ethan Carter (2014). Six years later, she returned to voice acting for the animated comedy television series JJ Villard's Fairy Tales (2020) which premiered on Adult Swim.

She was confirmed to appear on the upcoming second season of the Shudder anthology series Creepshow (2021).

Career
Laurence began her career with guest roles on television series. In 1984, she made her acting debut with a recurring role on the CBS soap opera Capitol as Brenda Clegg. In 1986, Laurence had a guest appearance as Genna in an episode of the television series Highway to Heaven. In 1987, she made her film debut as the heroine Kirsty Cotton in Clive Barker's Hellraiser (1987). She starred alongside Clare Higgins and Doug Bradley as Pinhead. The film was a critical and commercial success, earning more than $14 million at the American box office. When discussing how she obtained the part, in a retrospective interview Laurence credited Barker for her being cast as the lead, stating:
"I had been in a teenage drama workshop because I had a crush on a boy. I took this workshop and a girl who works there who was also interning at New World at the time said they were casting this movie and couldn’t find the lead.  They had gone to Chicago, New York and Los Angeles. She had called me and asked me if I would go down and audition for this film and it was the day that Clive Barker and Chris Haig were going back to England that day. So I went over there and I read and Clive was terrific and he said “Would you retest for this?” So they flew me to England and had me retest and said “I am going to have to fight for you because the studio wanted a name, but to me you are Kirsty!” I got it because he fought for me."

In 1988, Laurence reprised her role as Kirsty in Tony Randel's sequel Hellbound: Hellraiser II. In 1989, Laurence guest-starred on the television series Monsters and Hunter.

In 1990, Laurence portrayed Jane in the film Face the Edge. In 1992, she appeared in the films Deuce Coupe, Hellraiser III: Hell on Earth, and Mikey. In 2000, Laurence starred in the film Cypress Edge and guest-starred on an episode of Beyond Belief: Fact or Fiction.

In 1994, Laurence starred in Lurking Fear and Stranger by Night. In 1995, she starred in the martial arts Western Savate. The same year, she guest-starred on Legends and appeared in the television films Triplecross and American Cop. In 1996, Laurence starred in the film Livers Ain't Cheap and guest-starred on Hercules: The Legendary Journeys. 

In 1997, she starred as Jennifer Taylor in the film Cupid and guest starred on the television series Suddenly Susan. In 1999, Laurence portrayed Janine DeVrie in the thriller film A Murder of Crows and Kris Miller in the horror film Warlock III: The End of Innocence. The same year, she guest starred on the television series Beverly Hills, 90210.

In 2002, Laurence reprised her role as Kirsty Cotton in the horror film Hellraiser: Hellseeker and portrayed Dakota in the television film Gentle Ben. The following year, she reprised her role as Dakota in the television film sequel Gentle Ben 2: Danger on the Mountain. In 2004, she portrayed Jenny Graves in the drama film Lightning Bug and had a guest role on the television series ER.

In 2008, she appeared in the drama film Red, based on the novel by Jack Ketchum. In 2009, Laurence appeared in Slipknot's music video for their song "Snuff". In 2014, Laurence made her voice-over debut in the video game The Vanishing of Ethan Carter. In 2016, Laurence starred in the film The Green Fairy.

In 2021, Laurence was confirmed to star alongside Keith David and Josh McDermitt in the upcoming second season of Shudder's anthology series Creepshow (2021).

Filmography

Film

Television

Music videos

Video games

References

External links 
 
 

20th-century American actresses
21st-century American actresses
American film actresses
American television actresses
Living people
Year of birth missing (living people)